William Wise or Bill Wise may refer to:

 William Furlong Wise (1784–1844), British naval officer
 Bill Wise (baseball) (1861–1940), American baseball player
 Willie Wise (born 1947), American basketball player
 Willy Wise (born 1967), American boxer
 William Wise III (born 1992), American basketball player
 Bill Wise, American actor

See also
 William Wiseman (disambiguation)